Shakirov is a Russian masculine surname of Turkic origin, its feminine counterpart is Shakirova. It may refer to:

Albina Shakirova (born 1987), Russian sports shooter
Alexander Shakirov (born 1981), Russian rugby union player
Elen Shakirova (born 1970), Russian basketball player
Habiburrahman Shakirov, Tatar imam
Mukhamed Shakirov (born 1933), Soviet long-distance runner
Renata Shakirova, Russian ballet dancer
Rinat Shakirov (born 1962), Kazakhstani pianist
Sherzod Shakirov (born 1990), Kyrgyzstani football player

Russian-language surnames